Limnonectes jarujini is a species of frog in the family Dicroglossidae, first described from near Kaeng Krachan Dam, Thailand. It occurs in southwestern  and southern, peninsular Thailand, and likely in adjacent southern Myanmar. It has been recorded from Kanchanaburi, Surat Thani, and Nakhon Si Thammarat provinces.

References

Further reading
McLeod, David S., John K. Kelly, and Anthony Barley. ""Same-same but different": another new species of the Limnonectes kuhlii complex from Thailand (Anura: Dicroglossidae)." Russian Journal of Herpetology 19.3 (2012): 261-274.
McLeod, David S., Scuyler Kurlbaum, and Ngoc Van Hoang. "More of the same: a diminutive new species of the Limnonectes kuhlii complex from northern Vietnam (Anura: Dicroglossidae)." Zootaxa 3947.2 (2015): 201–214.
Matsui, Masafumi, et al. "A new tree frog of the genus Gracixalus from Thailand (Amphibia: Rhacophoridae)." Zoological Science 32.2 (2015): 204–210.

External links

jarujini
Amphibians of Thailand
Endemic fauna of Thailand
Amphibians described in 2010